Anine Susanne Kruse Skatrud (born 1 November 1977 in Oslo, Norway) is a Norwegian musician and choral conductor, the daughter of Professor of Music Gro Shetelig and the composer Bjørn Kruse, sister of actress and singers Jannike and Benedikte Kruse, and married to trombonist and bandleader Even Skatrud Andersen.

Career 
Kruse studied music at Foss videregående skole before she attended the Norwegian Academy of Music. Here she got her diploma as choral conductor and singer, and after ten years of studies and as lecturer at the Academy, she soon (2014) get her master's degree in Conducting.

Together with her sister Benedikte Kruse, Anja Eline Skybakmoen, Ane Carmen Roggen and Ida Roggen, Kruse comprices the vocal group Pitsj.

In 2011 she performed the collaborative concert Pitsj & Gumbo in Oslo Concert Hall, where "A capella møter en hot New Orleans-rett". She has also sung within Det Norske Solistkor, World Youth Choir and World Chamber Choir, and in addition conducts the choir Bærum Vocal Ensemble.

Discography 
1992: Wenches Jul (CNR) with Wenche Myhre
1996: Gagarin – En Romfartsopera (Hemera) with Håkon Berge
2006: Pitsj (Grappa) with Pitsj
2006: Mylder (Richie Rich's Salsa House, with Jan-Tore Saltnes
2009: Gjenfortellinger (Grappa) with Pitsj
2009: Edvard Grieg in Jazz Mood (Universal, 2009) with Pitsj & Kjell Karlsen ("I Dovregubbens hall")
2009: Med Andre Ord (DnC) with Jannike Kruse
2014: Snow Is Falling (Grappa)

References

External links 
Jeg reiser alene/Ole Paus – Anine Kruse Skatrud on YouTube

Norwegian women jazz singers
Musicians from Oslo
Norwegian choral conductors
Norwegian Academy of Music alumni
Academic staff of the Norwegian Academy of Music
1977 births
Living people
20th-century Norwegian women singers
20th-century Norwegian singers
21st-century Norwegian women singers
21st-century Norwegian singers
20th-century conductors (music)
21st-century conductors (music)
Pitsj members